This is a list of ministers from Pema Khandu cabinets starting from 15 September 2016 and ending on 21 December 2016 Pema Khandu was the leader of PPA, who was sworn in the Chief Minister of Arunachal Pradesh On 15 September 2016.

Council of Ministers

See also 

 Government of Arunachal Pradesh
 Arunachal Pradesh Legislative Assembly
 Kalikho Pul cabinet
 Pema Khandu ministry

References

Bharatiya Janata Party state ministries
2019 in Indian politics
Arunachal Pradesh ministries

Lists of current Indian state and territorial ministries
2019 establishments in Arunachal Pradesh
Cabinets established in 2019
Current governments